Emefa Akosua Adeti is a TV host and former beauty Queen who emerged winner for the Ghana Most Beautiful Beauty Pageant 2012.

Background 
Emefa comes from Bakpa in the Volta Region and to a family of four. She was born at Larteh Akuapem. Her father is Togbe Tutu V, the Awafiaga of Bakpa Traditional Area. Emefa attended  Mawuko Girls’ Senior High School after which she continued Takoradi Polytechnic now Takoradi Technical University  where she graduated with an HND in Marketing. She furthered her education and currently holds a BSc. and MBA in Marketing at the Ghana Institute of Management and Public Administration (GIMPA).

Career 
Emefa is a TV host and former beauty queen. She was also the co-host for Ghana most Beautiful (2016, 2017). She is also  a ambassador for Persons with Albinism in Ghana.

References

Living people
Year of birth missing (living people)
People from Volta Region
Takoradi Technical University alumni
Ghana Institute of Management and Public Administration alumni
Ghanaian beauty pageant winners